Shuijiahu railway station is a railway station in Changfeng County, Hefei, Anhui, China.

History 
The station was built in 1944. In 2009, it was rebuilt 300m metres north however in October passenger services ceased.

The station was reopened on 16 October 2012 as a stop on the newly built Hefei–Bengbu high-speed railway.

On 1 December 2019, the Shangqiu–Hangzhou high-speed railway opened.

References 

Railway stations in Anhui
Railway stations in China opened in 1944